Calytrix viscida is a species of plant in the myrtle family Myrtaceae that is endemic to Western Australia.

Distribution
Found in a small area in the Goldfields-Esperance region of Western Australia around Menzies where it grows in sandy gravelly soils.

References

viscida
Endemic flora of Western Australia
Myrtales of Australia
Rosids of Western Australia
Critically endangered flora of Australia
Plants described in 2013
Taxa named by Barbara Lynette Rye